Patrick Dumile Nono Maloyi is a South African politician who has been Member of the Executive Council (MEC) for Human Settlement, Cooperative Governance and Traditional Affairs in the North West province since November 2022. In August 2022, he was elected Provincial Chairperson of the African National Congress (ANC) in the North West, a position he formerly held from 2008 to 2009. His former positions include Speaker of the North West Provincial Legislature (2009–2012) and MEC for Human Settlement and Public Safety (2012–2014), and he has also served in the National Assembly.

ANC provincial chairperson: 2008–2009 
According to Maloyi, he became a member of the African National Congress (ANC) in the mid-1980s, and in the post-apartheid period he rose to prominence in the ANC of the North West province. He was a local leader of the ANC Youth League and, according to the Mail & Guardian, he was a political opponent of Popo Molefe, who represented the ANC as Premier of the North West between 1994 and 2004.

In 2008, at a hotly contested ANC provincial conference, Maloyi was elected provincial chairperson of the ANC in the North West. He was viewed as aligned to Thabo Mbeki, who had recently lost the ANC presidency to Jacob Zuma at the ANC's 52nd National Conference. However, Maloyi's term as ANC provincial chairperson ended prematurely when the ANC National Executive Committee disbanded the party's entire North West provincial leadership in July 2009. Maloyi's supporters claimed that the move was retribution by the national leadership for the North West's support for Mbeki at the 52nd National Conference.

When the North West ANC elected its new leadership in 2011, Supra Mahumapelo, who had been ANC provincial secretary under Maloyi, was elected to succeed Maloyi as chairperson. A source told the Mail & Guardian that Maloyi had intended to run for re-election but had lost the support of Mahumapelo and his supporters, and that the relationship between Maloyi and Mahumapelo subsequently soured.

Speaker and MEC: 2009–2014 
In May 2009, after the ANC's victory in the North West in the 2009 general election, Maloyi, while still provincial chairperson, was one of three candidates whom the provincial ANC recommended for the post of Premier. However, that position went to Maureen Modiselle and Maloyi was instead elected as Speaker of the North West Provincial Legislature. Summarising his tenure, which continued after he lost his ANC position, he quoted Charles Dickens: "it was the best of times, it was the worst of times". He resigned as Speaker in April 2012 and became Member of the Executive Council (MEC) for Human Settlement, Public Safety and Liaison under Modiselle's successor, Premier Thandi Modise.

Backbencher: 2014–2019 
Pursuant to the 2014 general election, Mahumapelo was appointed Premier; Maloyi was re-elected to his seat in the provincial legislature but was not re-appointed to the Executive Council. In June 2016, he resigned from the provincial legislature and was appointed to the National Assembly, the lower house of the national Parliament. He served less than a full term in Parliament, departing in February 2019.

ANC provincial chairperson: 2022

Election 
Mahumapelo's ANC provincial executive committee was disbanded by the ANC National Executive Committee in 2018 and Maloyi was appointed to the interim task team which was installed to take over the leadership of the provincial party. As early as 2020 the media speculated that when the province elected a new leadership corps, Maloyi might make a political comeback, as a leading member of a North West ANC faction known as "N12". In March 2022, he was formally nominated to stand for election to a second term as ANC provincial chairperson. He was nominated by his local ANC branch in Tlokwe near Potchefstroom, North West.

At the ANC's ninth provincial conference in the North West, held in Rustenberg in August 2022, Maloyi was elected provincial chairperson. He had run against Premier Bushy Maape and, initially, against Mahumapelo. However, shortly before the election, Mahumapelo pulled out of the race and endorsed Maloyi's candidacy. Maloyi won 370 votes against Maape's 294.

Return to the legislature 
On 8 November 2022, Maloyi was sworn back into the North West Provincial Legislature, filling a casual vacancy caused by the resignation of Kim Medupe. On 21 November, Maape, who remained the Premier, announced a cabinet reshuffle which saw Maloyi appointed MEC for Human Settlement, Cooperative Governance and Traditional Affairs.

Controversies

Travelgate 
In 2005, Maloyi was one of the politicians implicated in South Africa's Travelgate scandal, which concerned the abuse of parliamentary travel vouchers. The following year, he pled guilty to one count of fraud, in relation to an amount of R150,000, and in October 2006 he was sentenced to pay a fine of R60,000 or serve five years' imprisonment.

Phone tap 
In 2020 and 2021, several newspapers reported on claims that several North West politicians' phones had been tapped, allegedly by intelligence operatives working for Premier Job Mokgoro. Maloyi was allegedly one of the affected politicians and the Mail & Guardian reported that he had laid criminal charges in connection with the alleged wiretap.

Culpable homicide charge 
In 2022, during Maloyi's campaign for election as ANC provincial chairperson, some opponents – particularly in the Bojanala region of North West – argued unsuccessfully that he should be barred from contesting the position, in line with the ANC's step-aside policy, because he had previously been charged with culpable homicide. The charge was reportedly related to a 2018 car accident on the N12 which led to the death of one person. The National Prosecuting Authority had provisionally withdrawn the charge against him in May 2022, but Maloyi's opponents argued that the charge might be reinstated. Maloyi lamented that they were "trying to leverage an unfortunate situation for political gain". He said:The ANC step-aside rule was meant to root out bad apples from the organisation and not to settle political scores. The accident was an unforeseen and unfortunate incident. It was not corruption, money laundering, or any of the criminal acts that were meant to be rooted out by the step-aside policy.

References

External links 

 

Living people
African National Congress politicians
Members of the North West Provincial Legislature
Year of birth missing (living people)
Members of the National Assembly of South Africa
Tswana people